Anschela Gurijeva or Anjela Gourieva (born ) is a retired Russian female volleyball player, who played as a universal.

She was part of the Russia women's national volleyball team at the 2002 FIVB Volleyball Women's World Championship in Germany. On club level she played with VK Uralotschka-NTMK.

Clubs
 VK Uralotschka-NTMK (2002)

References

External links
http://www.fivb.ch/En/Volleyball/Competitions/WorldChampionships/Women/2002/Teams/VB_Player.asp?No=11353

1980 births
Living people
Russian women's volleyball players
Place of birth missing (living people)